Udea carniolica is a species of moth in the family Crambidae. It is found in Italy, Austria and Slovenia.

References

Moths described in 1989
carniolica
Moths of Europe